Peperonata is an Italian vegetable stew typically composed of red bell peppers, tomatoes and garlic.  It may be used as a sauce for pasta or served as a side dish to meat and fish dishes. It may be also included as part of a ragù.

See also 
 List of stews

References

Italian stews